Limbenii may refer to one of two communes in Glodeni District, Moldova:

Limbenii Noi
Limbenii Vechi